The All American Open was a golf tournament on the LPGA Tour from 1943 to 1957. It was played at the Tam O'Shanter Country Club in Niles, Illinois. It was played concurrently with the men's All American Open on the PGA Tour as well as All American Amateur events. Some of the pre-1950 events are considered official LPGA wins.

Winners
1957 Patty Berg
1956 Louise Suggs
1955 Patty Berg
1954 Babe Zaharias
1953 Patty Berg
1952 Louise Suggs
1951 Babe Zaharias
1950 Babe Zaharias
1949 Louise Suggs
1948 Babe Zaharias
1947 Grace Lenczyk
1946 Babe Zaharias
1945 Patty Berg
1944 Betty Hicks
1943 Patty Berg

References

Former LPGA Tour events
Recurring sporting events established in 1943
Recurring sporting events disestablished in 1957
Golf in Illinois
Niles, Illinois
1943 establishments in Illinois
1957 disestablishments in Illinois
History of women in Illinois